Christoph Stephan (born 12 January 1986 in Rudolstadt, Bezirk Gera) is a former German biathlete. In 2009 in Antholz, he won his first single World Cup Race.

Career highlights

IBU World Championships
2009, Pyeongchang,  2nd at 20 km individual
2009, Pyeongchang,  3rd at team relay (with Rösch / Peiffer / Greis)

World Cup
2009, Ruhpolding,  2nd at team relay (with Rösch / Peiffer / Lang)
2009, Rasen-Antholz,  1st at mass start

External links
 
 
 
 
 

1986 births
Living people
People from Rudolstadt
People from Bezirk Gera
German male biathletes
Sportspeople from Thuringia
Olympic biathletes of Germany
Biathletes at the 2010 Winter Olympics
Biathletes at the 2014 Winter Olympics
Biathlon World Championships medalists